The 2017 NCAA Fencing Championships took place from March 23 to March 26 in Indianapolis, Indiana at the Indiana Farmers Coliseum. The tournament went into its 28th consecutive NCAA Fencing Championships, and featured twenty-seven teams across all divisions.

Team results

 Note: Top 10 only
 (H): Team from hosting U.S. state

Individual results

 Note: Table does not include consolation
 (H): Individual from hosting U.S. State

References

2017 in American sports
2017 in fencing
2017 in sports in Indiana